, stylized as COBALT HOUR, is Yumi Arai's third studio album, released on June 20, 1975 by Toshiba EMI/Express (now part of EMI Music Japan). The album was also distributed by Alfa Records for a period of time, as Alfa also held ancillary rights to this and the other LPs Arai released during the time Alfa was still a publishing company; those rights later reverted to EMI Japan in 1994-thereabouts, when EMI regained distribution of Alfa's catalogue except for the artists who were published by Alfa and were distributed by other labels (and later retained most of it, including Arai's first 4 LPs [whose rights she had managed to buy before Alfa was sold to Sony], while the rest, the catalogue from when Alfa was a recording label and the bulk of the catalogue from when it was a publishing company, went with Sony Music Entertainment, including session player Haruomi Hosono's future work both as a solo musician and as part of Yellow Magic Orchestra). On April 26, 2000, the recording was digitally remastered for re-release on CD by Bernie Grundman. Internet sales of the album began March 10, 2005.

The album cover was illustrated by Pater Sato. Though Arai's nickname "Yuming" is written on the cover, it is clear that the "g" was added later.

Track list

Lyrics and arrangement by Yumi Arai, edited by Masataka Matsutoya.

Performers
 Haruomi Hosono: electric bass
 Shigeru Suzuki: electric and acoustic guitar
 Tatsuo Hayashi: drums
 Masataka Matsutoya: piano, Fender guitar, Rhodes piano, clavinet, Moog synthesizer, Hammond organ
 Nobuo Saito: percussion
 Koichi Matsuda: harmonica
 Aisuke Matsutoya: fiddle
 Tadayuki Harada: baritone saxophone
 Teruyoshi Fukushima and Kunitoshi Shinohara: trumpet
 Eiji Arai and his fellows: trombone
 Yoshihisa Tamano and his fellows: strings
 Yasuhiro Yamada, Junji Hayakashi, Soma Mitsuru: flute
 Mikiko Imamichi: harp
 Hi-Fi Set, Minako Yoshida, Taeko Onuki, Tatsuro Yamashita, Kayoko Ishu: backing vocals

Chart performance

Weekly charts

Year-end charts

References

1975 albums
Yumi Matsutoya albums
EMI Music Japan albums
Alfa Records albums